Academia Nacional del Tango de la República Argentina is an institution in Buenos Aires, Argentina, located in the Avenida de Mayo above the Café Tortoni.

Overview
The museum was established on June 28, 1990, by national decree with the aim of collecting, sorting, reviewing and saving from loss or destruction the cultural heritage of the tango.

The founder and first president was the poet and tango lyricist Horacio Ferrer.

Activities
The Academy has a comprehensive library and regularly conducts seminars, workshops and exhibitions.

Publications
The Academy has produced a series of publications in different formats (books, magazines, booklets) and the newspapers El Chamuyo and El Chamuyito.

See also
 List of music museums
 Café Tortoni

References

External links
 Academia Nacional del Tango de la República Argentina website

1990 establishments in Argentina
Museums established in 1990
Museums in Buenos Aires
National museums of Argentina
Performing arts museums
Tango in Argentina